Kurt Pickard (born 14 March 1991) is a BMX racer who was born in Tauranga, New Zealand. Pickard was selected for the New Zealand team in the 2012 London Olympics, finishing in 28th place.  Pickard attended Tauranga Boys' College.

References

External links
 
 
 
 

1991 births
Living people
BMX riders
New Zealand male cyclists
Olympic cyclists of New Zealand
Cyclists at the 2012 Summer Olympics
Sportspeople from Tauranga
21st-century New Zealand people